Valery Mikhaylovich Alistarov (born 28 November 1957, Kaluga) is a Soviet, Russian and Ukrainian footballer. Master of Sports of the USSR. RSFSR Champion 1977.

Biography 
The pupil of FC Lokomotiv Kaluga. He played in the highest league of the championship of Ukraine FSC Bukovyna (he was captain of the team) and MFC Kremin.

Player's career continued until 2008, speaking at the amateur level for FC Zarya  Duminichi, where he was player-coach.

Later - veteran player FC Zarya-KADVI  and the coach of the first team, serving in the championships Kaluga and Kaluga Oblast.

References

External links
 Статистика чемпионата Украины
 Сайт ФК «Буковина»
 Футбол Украины. История и статистика
 

1958 births
Living people
Sportspeople from Kaluga
Russian footballers
Soviet footballers
Association football midfielders
FC Lokomotiv Kaluga players
FC Bukovyna Chernivtsi players
FC Kremin Kremenchuk players
FC Metalurh Zaporizhzhia players
Soviet First League players
Soviet Second League players
Ukrainian Premier League players
Russian expatriate footballers
Expatriate footballers in Ukraine
Russian expatriate sportspeople in Ukraine